Minesweeper flotillas of the Kriegsmarine were administrative units which grouped German minesweepers together.  There were three types of minesweeper flotillas: standard minesweepers, auxiliary minesweepers, and "mine barrage" vessels.  Flotilla commanders operated from a shore office, and were usually commanded by an officer ranked as a Korvettenkapitän.  All minesweeper flotillas were under the command of the Führer der Minensuchboote (Leader of Minesweepers) which, by 1940, had been divided into three separate offices for activities in the North Sea, Baltic Sea, and off the coast of France.

When operationally deployed, the minesweepers were under a separate chain of command under the authority of harbor security commanders.

Minesweeper flotillas

The first minesweeper flotilla of the Kriegsmarine was formed in 1936 from pre-existing units of the Reichsmarine, which had maintained two minesweeper and one auxiliary minesweeper flotillas during the inter-war years. The standard German minesweeper flotilla of World War II contained between seven and fifteen minesweeper class vessels.

Auxiliary Minesweeper flotillas

In addition to the standard minesweeper flotillas, twenty "auxiliary minesweeper" (R boat) flotillas (Räumboots-Flottille) were formed during the Second World War.

 1. Räumboots-Flottille
Established in October 1937, with boats: R 17, R 18, R 19, R 20, R 21, R 22, R 23, R 24.
 Other boats assigned during its existence: R 43, R 52, R 65, R 66, R 67, R 68, R 69, R 70, R 71, R 72, R 73, R 74, R 75, R 76, R 106, R 119, R 120, R 127, R 128, R 145, R 150, R 249, R 259, R 260, R 268.
 Escort ship assigned: Nettelbeck, Nordpol.

 2. Räumboots-Flottille
Established in November 1938, with boats: R 25, R 26, R 27, R 28, R 29, R 29, R 30, R 31, R 32.
 Other boats assigned during its existence: R 74, R 77, R 84, R 86, R 113, R 114, R 116, R 125, R 129, R 169.
 In 1945 was composed by boats: R 412, R 413, R 414, R 415, R 416, R 417.
 Escort ship assigned: tender Brommy.

 3. Räumboots-Flottille 
Established in 1939 at Pillau, with boats: R 33, R 34, R 35, R 36, R 37, R 38, R 39, R 40.
 Other boats assigned during its existence: R 163, R 164, R 165, R 166 R 196, R 197, R 203, R 204, R 205, R 206, R 207, R 208, R 209, R 216, R 248.
 Escort ship assigned: tender Von der Groeben.
 In 1945 was composed by boats: R 270, R 288, R 289, R 418, R 420, R 421, R 422 R 423.
 Escort ship assigned: Gazelle.

 4. Räumboots-Flottille 
Established in April 1940, with boats: R 41, R 42, R 43, R 44, R 45, R 46, R 47, R 48, R 49, R 50, R 51, R 52.
 Other boats assigned during its existence: R 80, R 83, R 115, R 120, R 126, R 128, R 138, R 143, R 150, R 218, R 240, R 243, R 244, R 245, R 246, R 255, R 262, R 274, R 275, R 290, R 291.

 5. Räumboots-Flottille 
Established in August 1939, with boats: R 1, R 3, R 4, R 5, R 6, R 7, R 8, R 9, R 10, R 11, R 12, R 13.
 In 1941 was composed by boats: R 53, R 54, R 55, R 56, R 57, R 58, R 59, R 60, R 61, R 62, R 63, R 64.
 Other boats assigned during its existence: R 89, R 90, R 113, R 121, R 122, R 124, R 238, R 250, R 269, R 273.
 Escort ship assigned: Elbe.

 6. Räumboots-Flottille 
Established in July 1941 at Cuxhaven, with boats: R 9, R 10, R 11, R 12, R 13, R 14, R 15, R 16.
 Other boats assigned during its existence: R 1, R 3, R 4, R 6, R 7, R 8, R 115, R 187, RA 10 (former English motor torpedo boat), and RD-boats: RD 116, RD 117, RD 118, RD 119, RD 120, RD 121, RD 122, RD 127, RD 128, RD 129, RD 130, RD 131.

 7. Räumboots-Flottille 
Established in October 1940, with boats: R 151, R 152, R 153, R 154, R 155, R 156, R 157, R 158, R 159, R 160, R 161, R 162.
 Other boats assigned during its existence: R 173, R 202, R 223, R 262, R 277.
 Escort ship assigned: Weser

 8. Räumboots-Flottille 
Established in January 1942, with boats: R 92, R 93, R 94, R 95, R 96, R 97, R 98, R 99, R 100, R 101.
 Other boats assigned during its existence: R 113, R 117, R 118, R 130, R 146, R 147, R 257, R 258, R 409.
 Escort ship assigned:  Nadir, Schwertfisch.

 9. Räumboots-Flottille 
Established in May–June 1942 at Rotterdam.
 Boats assigned during its existence: R 85, R 87, R 88, R 103, R 104, R 105, R 107, R 108, R 109, R 110, R 111, R 112, R 131, R 148, R 149, R 247, R 251, R 412, R 413, R 414, R 415, R 416, R 417
 Escort ship assigned: Alders.

 10. Räumboots-Flottille 
Established in February–March 1942 at Cuxhaven
 Boats assigned during its existence: R 175, R 176, R 177, R 179, R 180, R 181, R 182, R 183, R 184, R 190, R 213, R 217, R 218, R 219, R 221, R 222, R 224, R 234.
 Escort ship assigned: von der Lippe.

 11. Räumboots-Flottille 
Established in September 1939, with 8 fishing trawlers and 1 escort ship. In October 1940, was renamed 7th Minesweeper Flotilla and assigned purpose-built R-boats.
 Boats assigned during its existence, from 1942: R 39, R 161, R 162, R 189, R 192, R 198, R 199, R 200, R 201, R 212, R 215, RD 102, RD 103, RD 104, RD 105, RD 109, RD 111, RD 112, RD 113, RD 114, RD 148, RD 149, RA 252, RA 253, RA 254, RA 258, RA 260, RA 261, RA 262, RA 263, RA 264, RA 267, RA 268.
  
 12. Räumboots-Flottille 
Established in May 1942 at Bruges; then moved into the Mediterranean. Dissolved in February 1945.
 Boats assigned during its existence: R 34, R 38, R 40, R 178, R 185, R 186, R 188, R 190, R 191, R 194, R 195, R 210, R 211.
 Escort ship assigned: von der Groeben.

 13. Räumboots-Flottille 
Established on 15 November 1943; used in the German Bight. In 1957, the flotilla was transferred to the new German Navy (Bundesmarine) from the German Mine Sweeping Administration.
 Boats assigned during its existence: R 132, R 133, R 134, R 135, R 136, R 137, R 138, R 139, R 140, R 141, R 142, R 144, R 177, R 252.
 Escort ship assigned: Nordsee.

 14. Räumboots-Flottille 
Established in December 1943; used in the English Channel. After the invasion of France in June 1944 was used in the German Bight and the Baltic Sea.
 Boats assigned during its existence: R 18, R 214, R 219, R 225, R 226, R 227, R 227, R 228, R 229, R 230, R 231, R 232, R 233, R 235, R 236, R 237, R 242, R 259, R 263.
 Escort ship assigned: Barbara.

 15. Räumboots-Flottille 
Established on 1 July 1944; used in the Baltic Sea, including Finnish waters. Disbanded after the German surrender.
 Boats assigned during its existence: R 239, R 240, R 241, R 243, R 244, R 245, R 254, R 255, R 256, R 409, R 410, R 411.

 16. Räumboots-Flottille 
Established in October 1944, main base Haugesund, Norway. Dissolved on 25 November 1947.
 Boats assigned during its existence: R 264, R 266, R 267, R 401, R 402, R 403, R 404, R 405, R 406, R 407, R 408, R 424.

 17. Räumboots-Flottille 
Established in July 1944 with school and training boats; initially named Räumbootsflottille zbV, and used in the Baltic Sea. Dissolved late 1947.
 Boats assigned during its existence: R 55, R 71, R 102, R 167, R 170, R 174, R 175, R 176, R 181, R 220, R 241, R 246, R 249, R 290.

 21. Räumboots-Flottille 
Established in July 1943. The flotilla consisted of 12 large escort minesweepers (Geleit-Räumbooten) based at Bergen, Norway. Dissolved early 1946.
 Boats assigned during its existence: R 301, R 302, R 303, R 304, R 305, R 306, R 307, R 308, R 309, R 310, R 311, R 312

 25. Räumboots-Flottille 
Established in the summer of 1945 at Denmark with boats from various flotillas, for the German Mine Sweeping Administration. Dissolved early 1946.
 Boats assigned during its existence: R 18, R 23, R 65, R 234, R 254, R 257, R 258, R 409, R 410, R 411
 Escort ship assigned: Riegel.

 30. Räumboots-Flottille 
Established in June 1943 with small Dutch minesweepers and moved into the Black Sea. Dissolved in August 1944.
 Boats assigned during its existence: R 30, RA 51, RA 52, RA 54, RA 56.

Mine Barrage flotillas

Mine barrage flotillas (Sperrbrecherflottille) were composed of auxiliary naval ships and merchant vessels that had been converted to enter minefields ahead of other ships in order to detonate enemy mines.  These Sperrbrecher vessels were heavily armored and were occasionally outfitted as anti-aircraft platforms.  The Kriegsmarine first organized the mine barrage vessels into Speerbrechergruppe (mine barrage groups) at the start of World War II.  Each group contained various auxiliary vessels designated by roman numerals augmented by a naval tender.

Original mine barrage groups

 Group One: Sperrbrecher X, XI, & XII 
 Group Two: Sperrbrecher I, II, III
 Group Three: Never formed
 Group Four: Sperrbrecher IV, V, VI
 Group Five: Never formed
 Group Six: Sperrbrecher VIII, IX

In June 1940, the Kriegsmarine formed a mine barrage unit in the Low Countries known as Sperrbrechergruppe Niederlande.  Shortly thereafter, the Kriegsmarine began to designate mine barrage vessels with capitol letters, but only three such vessels were ever declared (Sperrbrecher A, B, & C).  By late 1940, the mine barrage vessels were designated with standard numbers while the mine barrage groups were re-designated as flotillas.  Eight flotillas were authorized with seven eventually formed; the standard rank for a mine barrage flotilla commander was Fregattenkapitän.  As the  Sperrbrecher ships were mostly auxiliary vessels, the flotillas were considered administrative in nature and operated from shore offices.

Mine barrage flotillas

Support craft and tenders

In addition to the standard Sperrbrecher craft, some flotillas possessed support and tender vessels for refit and supply duties

Mine barrage support vessels

 Flak defense ship 28 (1st Flotilla)
 Artillery boat K4 (1st Flotilla)
 Control ship Möwe (1st Flotilla)
 Control ship F4 (2nd Flotilla)
 Night patrol ship  (3rd Flotilla)
 Steamship Frisia IX (8th Flotilla)
 Tender Hamburg (1st Flotilla)

References

Notes

Military units and formations of the Kriegsmarine
Minesweepers
Naval mine units and formations